Auber Octavius Neville (20 November 1875 – 18 April 1954) was a British-Australian public servant, notably Chief Protector of Aborigines, in Western Australia.

Early life

Born in  Northumberland, England, Neville emigrated to Victoria, Australia as a child.

Career

In 1897, he went from Victoria to Western Australia and joined the civil service there, quickly rising through the ranks. In 1910, Neville was appointed as the secretary of a new department organising immigration and tourism, and assisted in fostering the migration of 40,000 people to Western Australia over the next few years. Following the outbreak of World War I, he was appointed as secretary of the War Patriotic Fund.

In 1915, Neville became the state's second appointment to the role of the Chief Protector of Aborigines. During the next quarter-century, he presided over the controversial policy of removing Aboriginal children from their families; children who came to be called the Stolen Generations. In 1936, Neville became the Commissioner for Native Affairs, a post he held until his retirement in 1940.

The practice of removing mixed race Aboriginal/European children from their families was advocated at the time as part of a plan to "breed out the colour" by having those children brought up as though they were white, with the idea that they would marry people with light and lighter skin tones over successive generations, until there would be no Aborigines in Australia at all. At the time it was believed that full-blood Aborigines were dying out. In 1934, the WA government set up the Moseley Royal Commission, to examine the state of Aboriginal people with regard to the role of Chief Protector. The result was that the Chief Protector was given more authority over the lives of Western Australian Aboriginal people which, some say, only increased their suffering. In 1937, Neville declared:
Are we going to have one million blacks in the Commonwealth or are we going to merge them into our white community and eventually forget that there were any Aborigines in Australia?

Neville believed that biological absorption was the key to 'uplifting the Native race.' Speaking at the Moseley Royal Commission, he defended the policies of forced settlement, removing children from parents, surveillance, discipline and punishment, arguing that:

"[T]hey have to be protected against themselves whether they like it or not. They cannot remain as they are. The sore spot requires the application of the surgeon's knife for the good of the patient, and probably against the patient's will."

Neville stated that children had not been removed indiscriminately, saying that:

"[T]he children who have been removed as wards of the Chief Protector have been removed because I desired to be satisfied that the conditions surrounding their upbringing were satisfactory, which they certainly were not."

In 1947, he published Australia's Coloured Minority, a text outlining his plan for the biological absorption of Aboriginal people into non-Aboriginal Australia. The book defends his policy but also acknowledges that Aborigines had been harmed by European intervention. For that reason, he said, more had to be done to assist them:

"I make no apologies for writing the book, because there are things which need to be said. So few of our own people as a whole are aware of the position [of Aboriginies]. Yet we have had the coloured man amongst us for a hundred years or more. He has died in his hundreds, nay thousands, in pain, misery and squalor, and through avoidable ill-health. Innumerable little children have perished through neglect and ignorance. The position, in some vital respects, is not much better today than it was fifty years ago. Man is entitled to a measure of happiness in his life. Yet most of these people have never known real happiness. Some are never likely to know it. The causes of their condition are many. Mainly it is not their fault, it is ours, just as it lies with us to put the matter right."

In 1947, following his retirement, he was invited to represent the State of Western Australia on discussions regarding Aboriginal Welfare in connection with the Woomera Test Range, prior to its establishment.

Neville was a notable resident of Darlington, and was a regular user of the Eastern Railway which closed a few months before his death. He died in Perth, and was buried in Karrakatta Cemetery.

Portrayals 
Neville has been portrayed in artistic works as the public face of this policy in the 2002 film Rabbit Proof Fence (played by Kenneth Branagh), and in Jack Davis' 1985 play, No Sugar.

Notes

References

Further reading

 Aboriginal welfare : initial conference of Commonwealth and state Aboriginal authorities held at Canberra, 21 to 23 April, 1937
 South West Aboriginal Land and Sea Council, Host, John with Owen, Chris, It's still in my heart, this is my country: The Single Noongar Claim History, UWA Press, 2009, 

1875 births
1954 deaths
Burials at Karrakatta Cemetery
Public servants of Western Australia
Stolen Generations
Department of Aboriginal Affairs (Western Australia)
People from Northumberland
British emigrants to colonial Australia